Protein NPAT also known as nuclear protein of the ATM locus is a protein that in humans is encoded by the NPAT gene.

Interactions 

NPAT (gene) has been shown to interact with Glyceraldehyde 3-phosphate dehydrogenase and POU2F1.

References

Further reading